The 1909 Giro d'Italia was the inaugural edition of the Giro d'Italia, one of cycling's Grand Tours. The Giro began in Milan on 13 May, and Stage 4 occurred on 20 May with a stage to Rome. The race finished in Milan on 30 May.

Stage 1
13 May 1909 — Milan to Bologna,

Stage 2
16 May 1909 — Bologna to Chieti,

Stage 3
18 May 1909 — Chieti to Naples,

Stage 4
20 May 1909 — Naples to Rome,

References

1909 Giro d'Italia
Giro d'Italia stages